The Spanish Fly is a 1955 West German comedy film directed by Carl Boese and starring Joe Stöckel, Erika von Thellmann and Rudolf Platte. It was shot at the Göttingen Studios with sets designed by the art director Ernst Klose. It was based on the 1913 play The Spanish Fly by Franz Arnold and Ernst Bach. A previous adaptation had been released in 1931.

Cast
In alphabetical order
Helmut Ahner as Otto
Elisabeth Flickenschildt as Helene
Albert Florath as Coldewey
Kurt Großkurth as Hartmann
Paul Henckels as Dr. Ambrosius
Ursula Herking as Frau Hartmann
Holger Hildmann as Fritz
Stanislav Ledinek as Pollack
Hans Leibelt as Breilmann
Elena Luber as Sekretärin
Jester Naefe as Hannelore Klinke
Rudolf Platte as Hugo Sommer
Lotte Rausch as Frau Semmelmann
Hans Richter as Dr. Gerlach
Gretl Schörg as Miss Hilton
Ruth Stephan as Jutta
Hans Stiebner as Oexle
Joe Stöckel as Heinrich Klinke
Hubert von Meyerinck
Erika von Thellmann as Käthe

References

Bibliography
 Goble, Alan. The Complete Index to Literary Sources in Film. Walter de Gruyter, 1999.

External links

West German films
1955 comedy films
German comedy films
Films directed by Carl Boese
German films based on plays
Remakes of German films
German black-and-white films
1950s German films
Films shot at Göttingen Studios
1950s German-language films